The War of the Roses (1981) is a novel by Warren Adler.

Plot introduction
The War of the Roses tells the story of Jonathan and Barbara Rose, and their descent from a picturesque family life into a world of macabre self-destruction.

Plot summary
The novel begins with the main characters, Jonathan and Barbara as they are introduced to each other. Some years later, seem happily married in a Washington, D.C., suburb. They have a dream house, filled with a lifetime's worth of antiques that they have collected, two children (Eve and Josh), a dog and a cat. Both of them are successful with their work, and they have recently hired an au pair to aid in the upkeep of the house and the children.  Jonathan is a successful lawyer, and Barbara has embarked on a gourmet business endeavour with a promising start.

However, when Jonathan has what is believed to be a heart attack Barbara realizes she no longer loves him and would not be distraught if he died. Upon returning home, she tells her husband that their marriage is over and it has been for some time and he never realized it.

Barbara hires the best divorce attorney in town. Jonathan would like the divorce to go smoothly. He offers Barbara a monthly allowance, as well as half of everything they have. Barbara rejects the offer, demanding the house and all of its contents, reasoning that as the homemaker, she was the one putting the house together, raising their children, and making it a home they both wanted. Jonathan refuses this rationale, puts an attorney of his own on a retainer, and opts not to move out, citing an old legal precedent which permits a couple to live under the same roof while going through a divorce.

Despite the warnings of their attorneys, both take it upon themselves to make the other miserable with sabotage, vandalism and violence.

Adaptation

In 1989, The War of the Roses was translated from novel to film, proving to be a huge success both financially and critically. The film starred Michael Douglas and Kathleen Turner and was directed by Danny DeVito, who also co-starred.

References

External links
Novel official website

1981 American novels
American novels adapted into films
Novels set in Washington, D.C.